Universal Soldier: Regeneration is a 2009 American science fiction action film directed and co-edited by John Hyams, written by Victor Ostrovsky, and starring Jean-Claude Van Damme and Dolph Lundgren. It is the fifth installment in the Universal Soldier franchise and the alternative sequel to the original Universal Soldier from 1992, ignores the events from the 1999 theatrical sequel Universal Soldier: The Return and the two made for television sequels that were produced in 1998.

Mixed martial artist Andrei Arlovski stars as NGU (Next Generation UniSol), a Universal Soldier of the latest type, along with fellow fighter Mike Pyle as Capt. Kevin Burke. Tekken star Jon Foo appears as a cameo in the film as one of the four UniSols. In the United States the film was released directly to video by Sony Pictures Home Entertainment on February 2, 2010. It had a theatrical release in the Middle East and Southeast Asia and some other parts of the world. The film has received mixed reviews and theatrically grossed $844,000 with a production budget of $9 million.

Plot
A group of terrorists led by Commander Topov (Zahari Baharov) kidnap the Ukrainian Prime Minister's son and daughter and hold them hostage, demanding the release of their imprisoned comrades within 72 hours. In addition, they have taken over the crippled Chernobyl Nuclear Power Plant and threaten to detonate it if their demands are not met. It is revealed that among the ranks of the terrorists is an experimental Next-Generation UniSol (NGU) (Andrei Arlovski), who was smuggled in by rogue scientist Dr. Robert Colin (Kerry Shale). U.S. forces join up with the Ukrainian Army at the plant, but quickly retreat when the NGU slaughters most of them effortlessly. Dr. Richard Porter (Garry Cooper), Dr. Colin's former colleague on the Universal Soldier program, revives four UniSols to take down the NGU, but they are systematically eliminated.

Former UniSol Luc Deveraux (Jean-Claude Van Damme), who is undergoing rehabilitation therapy in Switzerland with Dr. Sandra Fleming (Emily Joyce) with the goal of rejoining society, is taken back by the military to participate in the mission. As the deadline nears its expiration, the prime minister announces the release of the prisoners. The terrorists, having gotten what they wanted, rejoice and shut off the bomb. Dr. Colin, however, is not pleased with the outcome, as he feels his side of the business is not done. As the NGU is programmed not to harm the terrorists, Dr. Colin unleashes his second UniSol: a cloned and upgraded version of Andrew Scott (Dolph Lundgren) – Deveraux's nemesis – who quickly kills Commander Topov. However, Dr. Colin never considered Scott's mental instability, and he is killed by his own creation. Scott then reactivates the bomb before heading out to hunt the children.

In the midst of the chaos, Capt. Kevin Burke (Mike Pyle) is sent in to infiltrate the plant and rescue the prime minister's children. He is successful in locating them and leads them toward safety. On their way out, they encounter the NGU. The children flee as Kevin tries in vain to hold off the NGU, who stabs him to death after a brutal fight.

With 30 minutes remaining on the bomb's timer, a re-conditioned Luc is geared up and sent to the plant, where he kills every terrorist he encounters. He searches the buildings and finds the children cornered by Scott.  Scott, who has distorted memories of Luc, is about to kill the children when Luc attacks and a grueling fight ensues. In the end, Luc impales Scott on the forehead with a lead pipe and fires a shotgun through it, blowing his brains out.

As Luc escorts the children to safety, they are attacked by the NGU. Luc and the NGU take the fight to the site of the bomb, with less than two minutes remaining. During the melee, Luc removes the detonator and jams it in the back of the NGU's uniform as they both jump out of the reactor chamber. NGU pulls the detonator off his back as it explodes, taking him with it. U.S. soldiers quickly arrive on the scene and tend to the children as Luc leaves. Kevin's body is placed in a black bag and taken away, as well as recovered pieces of the NGU.

In Langley, Virginia, Kevin's body is shown stored in a cryogenic chamber as a new UniSol, along with multiple clones made of him.

Cast

Production

Development and writing
In a phone interview between director John Hyams and the Van Damme fanbase, the director commented:

Cinematography
Filmmaker Peter Hyams, John's father, served as the film's cinematographer. This film marked the first time Peter has acted as director of photography without also directing. Prior to Regeneration, Peter had collaborated with star Van Damme on the action thriller films Timecop and Sudden Death.

Release

Theatrical
The film premiered at the Fantastic Fest in Austin, Texas, U.S.A. on October 1, 2009.

The film was theatrically released in Israel on January 7, 2010, followed by the Philippines on January 8, followed by both Bahrain and the United Arab Emirates on January 27, both Malaysia and Singapore on January 28. A month later, it was released in Lebanon on March 25, Jordan on March 31 and Japan on June 26.

Home media
The film was officially released in the United States directly on DVD and Blu-ray on February 2, 2010, on February 9 in Brazil, April 5 in the United Kingdom, and May 4 in France and Germany.

Reception

Box office
The film has been mostly released directly to DVD / Blu-ray in the US and Europe, as well and the following figures do not include theatrical box office reports from important territories such as Israel, Japan or South Korea. As of April 7, 2010, the film has grossed $844,447 in United Arab Emirates, Singapore, Italy, Lebanon, Malaysia and the Philippines.

Critical response
Dread Central gave it 3 out of 5, saying "there is almost nothing but solid b-level action until the credits roll". In a retrospective, Tom Breihan of The A.V. Club called it the most significant action movie of 2009, crediting it with providing newfound levels of critical legitimacy to the straight-to-DVD format, and describing it as "good enough to leave its theatrical predecessor in the dust".

David Nusair of Reel Film Reviews gave it 1.5 out of 4 and called it "distractingly low-rent", a "mostly interminable mess" but that the sole saving grace was the "brutal fight sequences". He writes it off as a "misfire and a massive disappointment".

Sequel

Van Damme and Lundgren returned for a sixth installment, Universal Soldier: Day of Reckoning, as the first in the series to be filmed in 3-D. John Hyams also returned as director.

References

External links
 
 
 

2009 films
2000s American films
2000s English-language films
2009 science fiction action films
Alternative sequel films
American dystopian films
American films about revenge
American science fiction action films
Direct-to-video sequel films
Films about amnesia
Films about cloning
Films about hostage takings
Films about terrorism
Films about the United States Army
Films directed by John Hyams
Films set in Chernobyl (city)
Films set in Switzerland
Films set in Ukraine
Sony Pictures direct-to-video films
Universal Soldier (film series)